is a Japanese ski jumper. He is one of the most successful contemporary athletes in ski jumping, having won during the 2018–19 season thirteen World Cup events and all six possible titles in the World Cup season: overall title, ski flying title, Four Hills Tournament, Raw Air, Planica7, and Willingen Five. He is the third ski jumper in the history to win all four competitions in the Four Hills Tournament. He won a gold medal at the 2022 Olympic Games in Beijing on the normal hill and the silver medal on the large hill.

Major tournament results

Winter Olympics

FIS Nordic World Ski Championships

FIS Ski Flying World Championships

World Cup

Standings

Individual wins

Individual starts (162)

Winter Olympics
At the 2018 Winter Olympics, Kobayashi competed in the men's normal hill, placing 7th, as well as the men's large hill, placing 10th. He has also competed in the team event with teammates Taku Takeuchi, Noriaki Kasai, and Daiki Ito, finishing in 6th place.

Kobayashi won his first Olympic gold medal at the 2022 Winter Olympics in Beijing in the men's normal hill event. He became the third Japanese athlete to win a gold medal in the individual ski jumping events at the Olympics, after Kazuyoshi Funaki in the individual large hill event in 1998, and Yukio Kasaya in the individual normal hill event in 1972. He also succeeded in the other one tournament, in the men's large hill, placing 2nd.

Personal life

Ryōyū Kobayashi was born on 8 November 1996 in Hachimantai, Iwate Prefecture, Japan. He began skiing at the age of five but began ski jumping in the first grade inspired by his older brother and Japanese ski jumper Junshiro Kobayashi. He usually practiced at Tayama Ski Jumping Hill in Hachimantai and Hanawa Jumping Hill in Kazuno, Akita. In 2015, he joined Japanese ski jumping team Tsuchiya Home Ski Team.

He has two older siblings, Junshirō Kobayashi and Yūka Kobayashi, and a younger brother, Tatsunao Kobayashi; they all are ski jumpers. He attended Morioka Central High School and graduated in 2015.

References

External links
 

1996 births
Living people
Japanese male ski jumpers
Olympic ski jumpers of Japan
Ski jumpers at the 2018 Winter Olympics
Ski jumpers at the 2022 Winter Olympics
FIS Nordic World Ski Championships medalists in ski jumping
Olympic medalists in ski jumping
Olympic gold medalists for Japan
Olympic silver medalists for Japan
Medalists at the 2022 Winter Olympics